"Na srdci" is a single from the Holomráz album of the Czech pop music group Slza and Celeste Buckingham. The music was created by Lukáš Bundil and Dalibor Cidlinský Jr. and the text composed by Ondřej Ládek aka Xindl X and Mirka Miškechová.

Music video 
The music video was directed by Radim Věžník and it is about Petra and Celeste's divorce who are in the therapeutic session. The video is prompted by their memories. Petr and Celeste try to break out in good. It was shooting at the Martinický Palác.

References 

2017 songs
2018 singles
Celeste Buckingham songs
Slza songs
Songs written by Xindl X